Ixora temehaniensis is a species of flowering plant in the family Rubiaceae. It is endemic to the island Raiatea in French Polynesia.

References

External links
World Checklist of Rubiaceae

temehaniensis
Flora of French Polynesia
Data deficient plants
Taxonomy articles created by Polbot